Walter William Greaves (April–June 1907 – 1987) was a British cyclist who set the world record for distance ridden in a year - despite having only one arm and falling off numerous times. Greaves rode  in 1936.

Personal life
Greaves was born in 1907, his birth was registered in the North Bierley district, Yorkshire. He lived with his mother in Newlands Place, Undercliffe, Bradford. He lost an arm in a road accident when he was 14. One account says his father owned a car with running boards. His father was driving after drinking and Greaves opened the door, stood on the running board ready to jump, but was hit by a tram. His arm was so damaged that it was amputated below the elbow. Other accounts said that he had hung the arm out of a train window.

He developed an interest in communism which did little to help him find work as an engineer. According to the historian John Naylor, Greaves was unemployed and according to some, almost destitute. Unemployment in Bradford was high but "his reputation as a lefty troublemaker made employers reluctant to take him on". Tim Teale, a Leeds cyclist who knew Greaves said "Walter tried to make you sign up for the young communists but nobody took much notice".

Greaves was an outspoken teetotaller, a practice which had a sequel when he broke the record.

The 1936 World Endurance record

Record background

In 1911 the weekly magazine Cycling began a competition for the highest number of 100 mile rides or "centuries" in a single year. The winner was Marcel Planes with 332 centuries in which he covered . The inspiration for the competition was said to be the efforts of Harry Long, a commercial traveller who rode a bicycle on his rounds covering every part of England and Scotland and who covered  in 1910. The world record for distance cycled in a year began in an era when bicycle companies competed to show their machines were the most reliable. The record has been officially established nine times. A tenth claim, by the English rider Ken Webb, was later disallowed.

Preparations

The record that Greaves attempted had been set three years earlier by the Australian professional Ossie Nicholson. John Naylor said: 
[Nicholson] completed his ride in fine Australian weather, on good roads, with the best equipment and even a back-up vehicle. Much of it was even done on a smooth track, using a special bike. He had a masseur, and a manager who did all the planning, booking and ordering. The contrast with Walter Greaves couldn't be more stark.

Greaves appealed to the cycle trade for sponsorship but had little success. Three Spires Cycles of Coventry provided a bicycle and a small weekly sum in return for advertising rights. Cyclists around the country offered him accommodation but help from the cycle trade came only once his ride had started.

A report said Greaves was so short of money that he wore clothes "little more than worn-out rags" and lay awake worrying the ride would not continue for lack of funds.

The bicycle

The Three Spires bicycle had a modified handlebar and twist-grip gear-change to fit Greaves and his single arm. A single lever operated both brakes. But it was not ready when the attempt was due to start on 1 January 1936 and arrived five days later. The record had to be started on 1 January and completed by 31 December. The delay increased the daily distance Greaves was obliged to ride.

Unlike Nicholson's machine, Greaves' bicycle was heavy, with thick tyres to cope with snow and pitted roads. He rode with mudguards, lamps and a saddlebag. He later increased the gears to 65, 73 and 78. John Naylor said:

How on earth he rode a heavy, loaded bike up all those hills on a  gear and with only one arm is beyond me. And much of the riding was in the Pennines, up long steep gradients. According to his friend, Billy Woods, a special adaptation was made some time into the ride, a kind of cup for the arm-stump which fitted on to a handlebar extension. This allowed his left hand to put its weight on the bike and balance things out a bit. It must have been a tremendous relief, yet still wouldn't have helped him to pull on the bars when climbing.

Alan Magson, in a description of the bicycle, said: "It looks like a fairly standard road bike - not that different from today's machine outwardly at least. Not much in the way of brakes - but then he was trying to break a record and roads were considerably quieter then."

The 1936 record ride

Records had to be attempted during a single calendar year, but Greaves started his ride five days late because of the delay in delivering his bicycle. He rode in one of the hardest winters for years, with snow and ice lying until the end of February. He covered  in the first five days but fell off 19 times, including eight times in a day while riding through snow on high roads. A report in the Bradford Telegraph and Argus, written by a reporter who followed him by car, records that Greaves fell twice in the first  of the day as cars forced him off the road. In Leeds, he was blinded by a cloud of steam from a steam-powered vehicle, slipped on tram lines and fell off. He got up, cycled out of the city through lying snow and maintained his average .

The Telegraph and Argus report was headlined Persistence on a bicycle and began "W.W. Greaves, the one-armed Bradford cyclist, is a hero."

Greaves averaged  a day by the end of February. It rained through the summer and then turned foggy all November.

The cycling importer and patron, Ron Kitching, said:

Walter used to ride over to Harrogate and I asked him how he was managing with all the ice and snow. Apparently he just kept riding round and round the streets until they were cleared in order to get the miles in. I remember he used to ride with a feeding bottle with milk in it, and eat apples. He was a true vegetarian. And tough!

Greaves collided with a car at Yarm in July and an abscess developed as a result. Greaves lost two weeks in hospital. He rode  a day while recovering from the operation. From 20 September to 8 October he rode  a day. He rode into Hyde Park, London on 13 December and rode laps of the Serpentine to match Nicholson's record. He was joined by thousands of other cyclists.

A reception was held in a hotel that evening. Greaves had been a vegetarian since he was 20 and was a fervent teetotaller. Journalists at the reception offered him champagne to celebrate, making comments such as "Go on... We won't tell!" Greaves said: 

Greaves rode from 8 October until the end of the year to push himself further ahead Nicholson. He nevertheless rode  a day, finishing his year at midnight on New Year's Eve at the steps of the town hall in Bradford. The Telegraph and Argus reported "astonishing scenes reminiscent of those associated with the public appearances of famous film stars." The mayor gave him cheques and two trophies.

The shortest day, finished early because he fell off and had to repair his bicycle.

End of the record

Greaves record was set to fall even as he reached Bradford town hall. Next day another amateur rider, Bernard Bennett, set off to ride . The record fell twice more the same year, the second time to René Menzies - who matched the record at Alexandra Palace with Greaves beside him

Cycling reported:
Bernard Bennett was reported to say that he was attempting the record just for fun. As all this competition was going on in the United Kingdom, a year's race had commenced between two widely separated contestants, Ossie Nicholson from Down Under who had already tasted success, and a newcomer, René Menzies, a 48-year-old Frenchman of Scottish descent. René rode in the UK and on the Continent, searching for the hotter weather... Many miles away, Nicholson had found better weather and financial support; at the end of his year he had collected an amazing  thus time tasting more than glory as he had also pedalled his way clear of beating the  record, this time in 532 days.

He went on to ride  in 499 days.

The Golden Book
Walter Greaves' achievements were celebrated in 1937 when Cycling Weekly awarded him his own page in the Golden Book of Cycling.

Life after the record
Greaves became a member of the British League of Racing Cyclists, an organisation which broke away from the National Cyclists Union during the Second World War to promote massed racing on the open road. He also founded the Airedale Olympic cycling club and in 1949 organised a race from Bradford to Morecambe and back, and his prominent 'route markers' became a renowned distraction to normal traffic.

Greaves had a cycle shop in Bradford and built cycle frames in the late 1940s. He was a talented and innovative frame builder. All of his frames were sif-bronze welded, for lightness and strength. No lugs were used. The ‘La Victoire’ was of conventional design, while the ‘King of the Mountains’ was an unconventional short wheelbase type, built to his own design. It featured an almost upright seat tube with a specially formed seat pin which placed the saddle over the back wheel. There is a ‘King of the Mountains’ on display in Bradford Industrial Museum. The frame was built in 1948 and has nothing to do with his record ride, which was achieved on a Three Spires 'King of Clubs' bicycle.

Later, after a fire at his shop, he moved to Craven Forge beside the Leeds-Liverpool canal, halfway between Keighley and Skipton, it was then known as Winifred's Café.() According to the Telegraph and Argus, Greaves "struggled to make a living in the café and took a job at Water House Pressings. The café was later converted into a forge, making and selling garden ornaments. He also took to writing and singing songs in clubs and pubs in the area."

Greaves kept a monkey as a pet in the flat above the café, where he lived with his wife. He seems to have had an interest in exotic animals: the minutes of Yorkshire section of the British League of Racing Cyclists show that members had to talk him out of his plan to have a dancing bear for the annual dinner.

Greaves contracted Parkinson's disease in 1979, and died in 1987, aged 80.

Peter Duncan, an official of the Vegetarian Cycling and Athletic Club to which both belonged, said:
I stopped my car in the lay-by near the café about three years ago waiting for a friend to catch me up. As I waited, a frail, ragged scarecrow emerged from one of the huts and tottered laboriously up the steps to the house. With a shock I noticed that the left sleeve of the ragged overcoat was empty and I realised that this walking skeleton was all that was left of the robust, fanatical Walter that I had known in the 40s or 50s.

Greaves had been a single-minded, determined man described as reluctant to give way in arguments. The friendship between him and Duncan ended at a club meeting in 1951 when the two disagreed at an annual meeting and Duncan reported that Greaves said:

Notes

References

1907 births
1987 deaths
Cyclists from Yorkshire
Sportspeople from Bradford
Ultra-distance cyclists